Silverstoneia erasmios is a species of frog in the family Dendrobatidae. It is endemic to Colombia where it is known from the Cordillera Occidental and Cordillera Central in the Antioquia Department.

Validity of this species is uncertain; females are indistinguishable from Silverstoneia nubicola but males are unknown. Its higher altitudinal range (to  asl) than Silverstoneia nubicola (maximum elevation ) suggests that it might be a distinct species. Other data (males, vocalizations, DNA samples) are needed to resolve this question.

Description
Adult females measure  in snout–vent length (based on two specimens); males are unknown. Ventral colouration is immaculate. Thigh colouration is light.

References

erasmios
Amphibians of Colombia
Endemic fauna of Colombia
Taxa named by Marco Antonio Serna Díaz
Taxa named by Juan A. Rivero
Amphibians described in 2000
Taxonomy articles created by Polbot